Pryluky Raion  is a raion (district) of Chernihiv Oblast, northern Ukraine. Its administrative centre is located at the city of Pryluky. Population: 

On 18 July 2020, as part of the administrative reform of Ukraine, the number of raions of Chernihiv Oblast was reduced to five, and the area of Pryluky Raion was significantly expanded. Four abolished raions, Ichnia, Sribne, Talalaivka, and Varva Raions, as well as the city of Pryluky, which was previously incorporated as a city of oblast significance and did not belong to the raion, were merged into Pryluky Raion. The January 2020 estimate of the raion population was

Subdivisions

Current
After the reform in July 2020, the raion consisted of 11 hromadas:
 Ichnia urban hromada with the administration in the city of Ichnia, transferred from Ichnia Raion;
 Ladan settlement hromada with the administration in the  urban-type settlement of Ladan, retained from Pryluky Raion;
 Lynovytsia settlement hromada with the administration in the urban-type settlement of Lynovytsia, retained from Pryluky Raion;
 Mala Divytsia settlement hromada with the administration in the urban-type settlement of Mala Divytsia, retained from Pryluky Raion;
 Parafiivka settlement hromada with the administration in the urban-type settlement of Parafiivka, transferred from Ichnia Raion;
 Pryluky urban hromada with the administration in the city of Pryluky, was previously a city of oblast significance;
 Sribne settlement hromada with the administration in the urban-type settlement of Sribne, transferred from Sribne Raion;
 Sukhopolova rural hromada, with the administration in the selo of Sukhopolova, retained from Pryluky Raion;
 Talalaivka settlement hromada with the administration in the urban-type settlement of Talalaivka, transferred from Talalaivka Raion;
 Varva settlement hromada with the administration in the urban-type settlement of Varva, transferred from Varva Raion;
 Yablunivka rural hromada with the administration in the selo of Yablunivka, retained from Pryluky Raion.

Before 2020

Before the 2020 reform, the raion consisted of five hromadas:
 Ladan settlement hromada with the administration in Ladan;
 Lynovytsia settlement hromada with the administration in Lynovytsia;
 Mala Divytsia settlement hromada with the administration in Mala Divytsia;
 Sukhopolova rural hromada with the administration in Sukhopolova;
 Yablunivka rural hromada with the administration in Yablunivka.

References

Raions of Chernihiv Oblast
1923 establishments in Ukraine